The Frankfurt U-Bahn is a Stadtbahn system serving Frankfurt, Hesse, Germany. Together with the Rhine-Main S-Bahn and the Frankfurt Straßenbahn, it forms the backbone of the public transport system in Frankfurt. Its name derives from the German term for underground, Untergrundbahn. The licence contract is up to 31 December 2031 and is renewable. The contracting authority of VGF is the municipal transport company .

The U-Bahn opened in 1968, and has been expanded several times. It consists of three inner-city tunnels and above-ground lines in the suburbs. About 59% of the track length is underground. The network operates in a variety of right of ways typical of a light rail system, with above-ground sections operating on street and core sections running underground in the inner city.

Like all public transport lines in Frankfurt, the system has been integrated in the Rhein-Main Verkehrsverbund (RMV) since 1995. From 1974 until the founding of the RMV, the Stadtwerke were shareholders in the predecessor group, the Frankfurter Verkehrsverbund (FVV; Frankfurt Transport Association).

Eight of the nine lines travel through the city center (line U9 being the exception). In 2016, the U-Bahn carried 132.2 million passengers, an average of approximately 361,200 passengers per day. Most recently, on 12 December 2010, two new lines were added, the U8 and the U9, which open up the university campus and the new development area on Riedberg.

History 
At the beginning of the 1950s, the first plans were made to relieve the then already overburdened tram. More than 100,000 motor vehicles were registered in Frankfurt in 1958, and more than 180,000 commuters used the transport infrastructure on a daily basis. Various alternatives to the construction of a modern high-speed traffic system and the separation of above-ground traffic flows were discussed. On 5 April 1960 the SPD faction requested that the city council may commit to a Hochbahn of the system Alweg. Lord Mayor Werner Bockelmann, however, advocated from the outset the construction of a subway, which, however, was considered the most expensive option. On 7 July 1960 the city council therefore commissioned a city planner with the preparation of a general planning overview in order to compare the costs of the three systems: Alweg train, subway and sub-pavement tram. Responsible for the planning was elected in October 1961 Traffic Department Walter Möller. The decision was finally made in late 1961 in favor of the subway system, which was to be built in several sections using existing tram infrastructure. In the first construction phase, the tunnels of the inner city were to be built for the time being, which were to be connected via provisional ramps to the adjacent tram routes. It was not until the second construction phase that the tunnels were to be extended beyond the inner city and connected to suitable upgraded above-ground routes in the suburbs. In the third construction phase, the change from light rail to subway would have been completed, which was to operate completely independently of traffic in tunnels, cuts and dams.

On 28 June 1963 the first pile of rubble for the construction of the -long tunnel under the Eschersheimer Landstraße. For the first stage of development until 1975 - approximately corresponding to today's main lines A and B - construction costs of 565 million DM were expected. The new Lord Mayor Willi Brundert compared the "boldly begun subway construction" in 1964 in its dimensions with the medieval cathedral building.

After just one year, the ambitious mammoth project threatened to fail due to financing problems. Falling tax revenues and a tax policy geared towards federal and state governments drove the municipalities close to ruin in the mid-1960s. Frankfurt was 1.4 billion DM in debt in 1964, the most heavily indebted city in Germany, with a regular budget of 733 million marks. Under pressure to stabilize the budget deficit, the 1964-1965 municipal assembly reduced long-term investment planning from $2.7 billion to $1.7 billion and even hinted at some time that Eschersheimer Landstraße would be "impassable desert" after completion of the tunneling work.

The U-Bahn opened on 4 October 1968, with the underground route from Hauptwache to Nordwestzentrum.

On 19 December 1971, it was extended to Gonzenheim from Heddernheim. On 4 November 1973, the southern extension was opened toTheaterplatz. On 29 September 1974, it was being extended to Römerstadt. The new line was opened on 27 May 1978, and is from Zeilweg to Ginnheim. The southern extension to Südbahnhof was opened on 29 September 1984, and is the first main tunnel to cross the river. Niddapark, Lahnstraße and Rosengärtchen opened later on 1989 and 1997 respectively.

The second trunk route, route B, was built as a tram tunnel between Theaterplatz and Gießener Straße and opened in 1974. On 28 May 1978, both ends were extended to Hauptbahnhof and Preungesheim. In 1980 the line reached Seckbacher Landstraße and started to operate as a full U-Bahn, i.e. completely underground and entirely grade-separated.

The route C consists of parts of former tram lines and was integrated in 1986 with the tunnel. Since 1992, U7 has been extended to Enkheim, and on 30 May 1999, U6 has been extended to Frankfurt Ostbahnhof. The branch to Enkheim, as well as the two western legs, is a typical Stadtbahn route on a separate right-of-way, but with level crossings. All stops have high-level platforms. Heerstraße and Ebelfeld closed in 2004.

On 15 June 2008, line U4 was extended from Seckbacher Landstraße to Schäfflestraße, using the tracks that link the depot from both line U4 and line U7. This extension was a trial service for 6 months, with about every second train continuing to Schäfflestraße. Since 14 December 2008, every other train on line U4 has been running through to Enkheim sharing route with line U7, now as a permanent service.

A branch from Niederursel to Riedberg, and from there to Kalbach on line U2 was added on 12 December 2010, introducing the new lines U8 and U9.

Current lines 

The U-Bahn consists of nine lines, U1 to U9, running on three primary routes based on the three tunnels, with a planned fourth route from the suburbs to the Frankfurt Hauptbahnhof only partially completed.

Central sections of the route are called "basic route" or "trunk route"; these branch out into several "connecting lines", which are usually driven by only one line and are sometimes referred to as "upgraded lines". The terms "basic section" and "connecting section" and their designations are based on the names of the construction sections. Sections of the legs were designated by the letter of the route and a Roman numerical suffix - sections of the connecting lines with an Arabic numeral. The designation of the connecting lines "A1", "A2", "A3" and "B1" was also used to designate the lines until 1978.

Like all light rail vehicles, trams and subways in Germany, the Frankfurt U-Bahn is subject to the regulations of the tram construction and operating regulations. The tunnels as well as the above-ground section between Römerstadt and Ginnheim are completely developed as independent railway tracks, most of the other aboveground sections partly as an independent building, partly as a special track. These sections have numerous level crossings for road traffic and pedestrians. The U5 operates in the section between Friedberger Anlage and Marbachweg largely on street-level railway body.

Tunnels exist at -
 A Line: South of Dornbusch, into the city centre, Nordwestzentrum (small section)
 B Line: Scheffeleck and Seckbacher Landstraße to Bockenheimer Warte.
 C Line: Kirchplatz to Johanna-Tesch-Platz and Ostbahnhof

Routings
These are individual routings.

Future plans 
For the A Line, there are further plans to extend to Bad Homburg which might need 2 years of planning and 5 years of construction, it would complete in 2023. There might be a rehabilitation of tunnels at Eschersheimer Landstraße. Sachsenhausen can be awaited for extension on a long time.

For the B Line, rehabilitation is badly needed for Sigmund-Freud-Straße, Ronneburgstraße, Theobald-Ziegler-Straße, Gießener Straße and Marbachweg/Sozialzentrum (2013), Dt. Nationalbibliothek and Hauptfriedhof. There might be an extension to Wohnpark via Güterplatz, Emser Brücke and Europagarten, which might be opening in 2022. There might be an extension to Frankfurter Berg via August-Schanz-Straße and Berkersheimer Weg where construction can start in 2017. Bergen is another possible candidate.

For the C Line, future consideration plans would include Hanauer Landstraße, Leuchte, Steinbach, Bergen, Eschborn and it can be further extended to the west for either U6 or U7.

For the D Line, currently; there are plans to connect Bockenheimer Warte and Ginnheim (D II), it can be done through Ginnheimer Kurve or Europarturm. Other plans is to extend from Hauptbahnhof to Niederrad (D III) and it can be further extended to Schwanheim and Stadion.

 Ginnheimer Kurve: Franz-Rücker-Allee
 Europartum: Platenstraße, Bundesbank, Grüneburgpark/Uni-Campus Westend

Depots 
 Heddernheim - for A & D Lines
 Ost - for B & C Lines

Rolling stock

U1 Class

The U1 Class consists of two six-axle, two-section prototype vehicles made by Duewag in 1965, derived from the previous tramcars. Delivered in unpainted livery and later painted all red, it was used from 1966 to 1976 and was one of the world's first modern LRVs. The vehicles were removed from service after ten years because it was incompatible with newer types. A copy of a U1 Class is now stored in the Frankfurt Transport Museum.

U2 Class

The U2 Class were the first production vehicles for the network. Duewag built 97 vehicles of this type in three batches from 1968 to 1978. A fire at the depot in 1980 destroyed five sets and were replaced with seven replica sets in 1984. They were painted in a red and white livery and used from 1968 to 2016. A variant, the U2h, features a lower boarding height than the regular U2, and was in use until 2013.

The U2e was supposed to be a planned refurbishment project to take place in 2015, but due to age constraints, it was decided to replace all U2 cars with the newest U5 class. The last U2 car was withdrawn after a farewell trip on 3 April 2016, after over 48 years of service. U2h examples have been 303, 304 and 305 have been preserved.

Siemens adapted the U2 design for the North American light rail market, making the U2 the first modern LRV car in North America, currently in use in Edmonton and Calgary. San Diego used these sets until 2015.

U3 Class

The U3 Class is based on the U2, but have a slightly longer length, a lightweight design made entirely of steel, and was intended for underground operation. Duewag built 27 vehicles, which are painted in the present blue livery that was applied to RMV (formerly FVV) and have been in use since 1980. They were deployed on line U4, until being replaced in April 2015 by U5 train cars and transferred to line U6. In June 2017 the last type U5 car was delivered, which matched the retirement of type U3 train from service. As of October 2019, most trains should be refurbished and transferred to Monterrey Metro in Mexico.

U4 class

The U4 class is developed from the U3 class, technically based on and similar in appearance to the R type trams. Siemens/Duewag built 39 vehicles numbered 501–539 between 1994 and 1998, which have also received the current blue livery. They were originally deployed on lines U1, U2 and U3, and later on lines U8 and U9. An accident involving the two cars 517 and 532 on 28 February 2007 resulted in their early retirement from the fleet and being scrapped for spare parts. Since July 2010, all remaining U4 cars are going to be refurbished and get new yellow handrails to help color-blind people to orienting, as well as an air conditioning system in the cockpit until July 2017. Starting in March 2016, all cars should receive new white LED displays as a replacement for the aging flip-dot displays. The process was scheduled to complete in mid-2020.

U5 Class

The U5 Class, the newest of the U-Bahn fleet, has been produced by Bombardier Transportation in Bautzen since 2008. The first order of 146 vehicles was placed in 2005 and another order of 78 cars came in 2011. Two cars were damaged in a fire at the production factory in 2010. They have been deployed to all lines and will gradually replace the older cars in the coming years.

There are two versions of the U5 class: the U5-25 consists of two-section articulated sets like the older cars, while the U5-50 is formed of two permanently coupled U5-25 sets without cabs between the two sets. The concept is similar to the TW 2000 used on the Hanover Stadtbahn.

Streetcars

The Pt Class was used from 1978 to 2016 mainly on line U5, where the platforms were too low to accept the regular trains used on the other lines. As the line was gradually upgraded with high-level platforms as used on the remainder of the network, the Pt class cars are in limited service on tram lines 15, 17 & 20, whereas the Ptb, which was used for underground service, was withdrawn in 2016.

Network map

See also 

 Rhine-Main S-Bahn (Frankfurt)
 Trams in Frankfurt am Main
 Public transport in Frankfurt am Main
 List of rapid transit systems

References 

German

 Jens Krakies, Frank Nagel, Stadt Frankfurt am Main (Hrsg.): Stadtbahn Frankfurt am Main: Eine Dokumentation. 2. Auflage. Frankfurt am Main 1989, S. 23–42. (Standardwerk zur U-Bahn und ihrer Baugeschichte)
 Dieter Höltge, Günter H. Köhler: Straßen- und Stadtbahnen in Deutschland. 2. Auflage. 1: Hessen, EK-Verlag, Freiburg 1992, S. 23–42. (Alle ehemaligen und bestehenden Straßenbahnbetriebe in Hessen, außerdem ein Kapitel zur Frankfurter U-Bahn, die 2. Auflage besitzt einen Anhang mit Aktualisierungen)
 Hans-Werner Schleife, Günter Götz: Lexikon Metros der Welt. Geschichte, Technik, Betrieb. transpress, Berlin/Stuttgart 1985.  (101 U-Bahn-Betriebe der Welt, einschl. Beschreibung des Frankfurter Betriebs)
 Walter Söhnlein, Jürgen Leindecker: Die Frankfurter Lokalbahn und ihre Elektrischen Taunusbahnen. GeraMond, München 2000.  (Die U-Bahn ist nicht zentraler Gegenstand des Buches, als Nachfolgerin der Lokalbahnstrecken wird die Entwicklung der A-Strecken jedoch ausführlich beschrieben)
 Thomas Hanna-Daoud (Red.): Nahverkehr in Frankfurt. Trambahn, U-Bahn, S-Bahn, Omnibus, Eisenbahn. Strassenbahn-Nahverkehr special. Nr. 7. GeraMond, München 2000.  (Sonderheft des bekannten ÖPNV-Magazins zu allen Frankfurter ÖV-Netzen)
 Magistrat der Stadt Frankfurt am Main Stadtbahnbauamt (Hrsg.): Die C-Strecke der U-Bahn Frankfurt am Main. Stadtbahnbauamt, Frankfurt am Main 1986. (Informationen über Planung, Bau und Architektur der C-Strecke in Wort und Bild)
 Stadt Frankfurt am Main (Hrsg.): Gesamtverkehrsplan Frankfurt am Main. Ergebnisbericht 2004 (pdf). (Studie im Auftrag des Stadtplanungsamts zur zukünftigen Entwicklung Frankfurter Verkehrsnetze)
 Stadt Frankfurt am Main (Hrsg.): Inbetriebnahme der U-Bahn. Übergabe der Hauptwache und Eröffnung des Nordwestzentrums. Publizität des Presse- und Informationsamts, Frankfurt am Main 1969.

External links 

 
 traffiQ Mobilitätsberatung 
 Nahverkehr Frankfurt am Main 
 Frankfurt am Main at UrbanRail.net

 
Transport in Frankfurt
Underground rapid transit in Germany